The Indonesian Army Command and General Staff College in Bandung, West Java, is a prominent graduate school for Indonesian Army and sister-service officers, inter-agency representatives, and international military officers. The college was established in 1951 in order to fulfill the demands for army officers that will pursue their armed forces career in commands and leadership. It has been commanded by Major General Anton Nugroho since 18 June 2020.

History
The college was officially established in Jakarta  by the Chief of Staff of the Army on 5 October 1951. The first commander was Lieutenant Colonel A.Y. Mokoginta. The college was established because there was a shortage of well-trained army officers who were capable of advanced command and staff responsibilities or leadership such as unit commanders and executive officers. The first course, attended by 26 officers with the rank of captain or major, began in Cililitan, Jakarta on 17 November. On 17 February 1953, the first campus of the college was inaugurated by President Sukarno in Bandung. In 1961, the official abbreviation changed from SSKAD to SESKOAD, although the name of the institution remained the same.

Notable People & Alumni

Indonesian
Abdul Haris Nasution
Andika Perkasa
Feisal Tanjung
Gatot Subroto
Hendropriyono
Luhut Binsar Pandjaitan
Moeldoko
Prabowo Subianto
Ryamizard Ryacudu
Suharto
Susilo Bambang Yudhoyono
Syarifudin Tippe
TB Simatupang
Try Sutrisno
Umar Wirahadikusumah
Wiranto

International
Brig Gen James McDevitt, United States Armed Forces 
G. J. Leroy, United States Armed Forces
Maj Gen Kenneth Osuji
Brig Gen John Rowland, Australian Defense Forces
Colin East, Australian Defense Forces
J. W. Burns, Australian Defense Forces
Brig Gen Lim Hock Yu, Singapore Armed Forces
Lt Gen Melvyn Ong, Singapore Armed Forces
Maj Gen David Neo Chin Wee, Singapore Armed Forces
B. J. Marshall, New Zealand Armed Forces
Lt. General Asif Ghafoor, Pakistan Army

See also
United States Army Command and General Staff College

Notes

References
 
 
 

Indonesian Army
Military units and formations established in 1951
1951 establishments in Indonesia